Europa Universalis: Crown of the North (original title: Svea Rike III) is a real-time grand strategy video game developed by Paradox Interactive and published by Levande Böcker. It is the sequel to Svea Rike and Svea Rike II, and had its own sequel, Two Thrones. The Svea Rike series is the predecessor to Europa Universalis.

The plot takes place from the year 1275 in Scandinavia during a period of political disturbance. All events that take place in the game, with the exception of player-initiated events, are based on reality.

Europa Universalis: Crown of the North is the English-language version of the game. It was released in North America together with a re-release of Europa Universalis II at version 1.07, with the addition of new scenarios.

Reception
The game received "mixed or average" reviews on Metacritic.

References

External links
Official website via Internet Archive
Review at IGN

2000 video games
Grand strategy video games
Paradox Interactive games
Real-time strategy video games
Strategy First games
Video game sequels
Video games developed in Sweden
Video games set in Sweden
Video games set in the 13th century
Windows games
Windows-only games